Neo-uvaria is a genus of flowering plants belonging to the family Annonaceae.

Its native range is Indo-China to Western and Central Malesia.

Species:

Neo-uvaria acuminatissima 
Neo-uvaria laosensis 
Neo-uvaria merrillii 
Neo-uvaria parallelivenia 
Neo-uvaria sparsistellata 
Neo-uvaria telopea 
Neo-uvaria viridifolia

References

Annonaceae
Annonaceae genera